Education Week is an independent news organization that has covered K–12 education since 1981. It is owned by Editorial Projects in Education (EPE), a nonprofit organization, and headquartered in Bethesda, Maryland in Greater Washington DC.

The newspaper publishes 37 issues a year, including three special annual reports (Quality Counts, Technology Counts, and Leaders to Learn From). From 1997 to 2010, Quality Counts was sponsored by the Pew Center on the States.

History 
In 1957, Corbin Gwaltney, founder and then editor of Johns Hopkins Magazine for alumni of Johns Hopkins University, and a group of other university alumni magazine editors came together to discuss writing on higher education and decided to form Editorial Projects for Education (EPE), a nonprofit educational organization. Soon after, Gwaltney left Johns Hopkins Magazine to become the first full-time employee of the newly created EPE, starting in an office in his apartment in Baltimore and later moving to an office near the Johns Hopkins campus. He realized that higher education would benefit from a news publication. Gwaltney and other board members of EPE met to plan a new publication. In 1966, EPE published the first issue of The Chronicle of Higher Education.

In 1978, EPE sold Chronicle to its editors and shifted its attention. With the support of several philanthropies, EPE went on to launch Education Week under the leadership of Ronald A. Wolk. The first issue of Education Week appeared on September 7, 1981, and sought to provide Chronicle-like coverage of elementary and secondary education. It launched with a splash  by running a scoop about efforts by President Ronald Reagan's administration to downgrade the U.S. Department of Education, which was then still in its infancy. In August 1981, EPE officially changed the name to Editorial Projects in Education.

References

External links
 

Education magazines
Magazines published in Maryland
Magazines established in 1981